David James Millns (born 27 February 1965) is a first class cricket umpire and former English professional cricketer who played for Nottinghamshire County Cricket Club, Leicestershire County Cricket Club, Tasmania and Boland. Millns was a fast bowler, and a lower order batsman who was part of two championship winning sides with Leicestershire, in 1996 and 1998.

Playing career
His career spanned from 1988 until 2001. He is one of only a few cricketers in modern times to score a century and take ten wickets in the same county championship match (v Essex 1996).

Having been told he would be playing for England against Pakistan at the Oval in 1992 he broke a bone in his foot and was not officially selected. Millns toured Australia with the England 'A' side that winter, although he had more success with the ball in one-day matches than in the first-class matches. He was Leicestershire's leading wicket taker (and the sixth nationally) in 1994, taking 76 wickets at 25.01, with many cricket writers believing he should have gone to Australia for the 1994/95 Ashes tour. His best all round season came in 1996, when he took 73 wickets and scored 424 runs, and again many cricket writers picked him on the winter tour to the West Indies.

Umpiring career
In 2007, he was selected in the reserve list as a first class umpire (cricket)|umpire for the season of 2008 by ECB. In 2008, he was promoted to the first class umpire's list. He stood as an umpire in the 2014–16 ICC Women's Championship. He was selected as one of the two foreign umpires in the 2019–20 Bangladesh Premier League.

In January 2022, he was named as one of the on-field umpires for the 2022 ICC Under-19 Cricket World Cup in the West Indies.

See also
 List of One Day International cricket umpires
 List of Twenty20 International cricket umpires

References

External links
 

1965 births
Living people
English cricketers
Nottinghamshire cricketers
Leicestershire cricketers
Boland cricketers
Tasmania cricketers
English cricket umpires
People from Newark and Sherwood (district)
Cricketers from Nottinghamshire
English One Day International cricket umpires
English Twenty20 International cricket umpires